Romon U-park is a 200,000 m2 amusement park located in the south of Ningbo, China. By its size it can be considered one of the largest urban indoor theme parks in the world. It is funded by the leading Chinese clothing manufacturer Romon Group.
Romon U-park consists of a 57.4m high indoor park and an outdoor park "Legend Island". There are six differently themed zones in the park; Romantic Avenue, Fantasy Dream, Mystery Land, Adventure Challenge, Festival Plaza and The Island of Legends. In all there are over 30 attractions, 30 specialty restaurants and 20 specialty shops.

Etymology: Romon is a Chinese clothing manufacturer and the "U" in "Romon U-Park" is for "Universal". The total cost of the project was over 3 billion RMB.

Attraction Areas
 Romantic Avenue
 Fanatasy Dreams
 Mystery Land
 Adventure Challenge
 Island of Legends
 Festival Plaza

The park has a two station monorail that runs above both the indoor and outdoor attractions travelling across the entire venue.  The track has switches so the route can be limited to the indoor area in case of inclement weather.

Surrounding facilities
 Romon Universal Paradise Hotel 
 Hilton Garden Inn Ningbo Romon 
This hotel is the brand's first project in Ningbo and functions as a hotel for the Romon Fairyland theme park. Special attention was given to make both family and business travelers feel at home. The dramatic spiral staircase on the ground floor creates the graceful spine of the camphor tree inspired main entrance.
 Shopping center— Romon Mall

Multimedia Shows

A major attraction of the park are its multimedia shows, including "The Source of Light" about the adventures of two panda bears "Romon" and "Romie", as well as "Zheng He is coming" about Zheng He, a Chinese admiral and diplomat of the 15th century. 
 	
Both shows include video projection mapping, laser beams and laser graphic effects, digital water screen, fire bursts, lights, fog, music and sound effects.  Shows are technically based on 10 Barco video projectors projecting onto the 30x30 meter pyramid, the 20 meter wide pyramid stage screen and the back wall. Two video servers, 12 full colour laser projectors, 48 moving lights, 20 flame bursts, and the 18 meter digital water screen are all centrally controlled and synchronized.

Both multimedia shows became a core attraction of the Romon U-Park. Emotion Media Factory was responsible for all aspects of project planning, as well as system operation and maintenance. Music was created by Selcuk Torun.

Awards
In October 2015 "Zheng He is coming" multimedia show by Emotion Media Factory becomes a finalist of the Brass Rings Awards by IAAPA. The equivalent of the Oscars for the Amusement Park Industry, the award is to be given to multimedia attractions with a budget of $1 million or more.

See also
Fountain
Musical fountain
Chiang Mai Night Safari
Lotte World
AIDA Cruises

References

External links
 Official website
 Romon U-Park multimedia shows on Emotion Media Factory web-site

Amusement parks in China
Buildings and structures in Ningbo